"Crocodile" is a song by British electronic music band Underworld, and was released as a single on September 12, 2007, in Japan first, in order to promote their album Oblivion with Bells.  On September 5, Underworld released the music video for "Crocodile" on their website. This song, as well as its Oliver Huntemann Remix, is featured in the game FIFA Street 3. The single peaked on the UK Singles Chart at number 93.

Track listing

CD: underworldlive.com, UWR000193 (UK) 
 "Crocodile" (radio edit) – 3:52
 "Crocodile" (Pete Heller Remix) – 7:33
 "Peach Tree" – 12:35

CD: Traffic, TRCP13 (JP)
 "Crocodile" (radio edit) – 3:52
 "Crocodile" (Pete Heller Remix) – 7:33
 "Crocodile" (Oliver Huntemann Remix) – 8:35
 "Crocodile" (Oliver Huntemann Dub) – 7:26

CD: underworldlive.com, (UK/US) promo
 "Crocodile" (LP version) – 8:58
 "Crocodile" (single edit) – 3:52
 "Crocodile" (Pete Heller Remix) – 7:33
 "Crocodile" (Oliver Huntemann Remix) – 8:35
 "Crocodile" (Oliver Huntemann Dub) – 7:26

CD: underworldlive.com, (UK) promo
 "Crocodile" (LP version) – 8:58
 "Crocodile" (single edit) – 3:52
 "Crocodile" (Pete Heller Remix) – 7:33
 "Crocodile" (Pete Heller Dub) – 7:27
 "Crocodile" (Oliver Huntemann Remix) – 8:35
 "Crocodile" (Oliver Huntemann Dub) – 7:26
 "Crocodile" (Innervisions Orchestra Remix) – 10:27

CD: underworldlive.com, (UK) promo
 "Crocodile" (LP version) – 8:58
 "Crocodile" (single edit) – 3:52
 "Crocodile" (Pete Heller Remix) – 7:33
 "Crocodile" (Innervisions Orchestra Remix) – 10:27

CD: PIAS, (AU) promo
 "Crocodile" (single edit) – 3:52

CD: Traffic, TRPCD-1 (JP) promo
 "Crocodile" (single edit) – 3:52

12": underworldlive.com, UWR-000019-4 (UK)
 "Crocodile" (album version) – 8:58
 "Crocodile" (Oliver Huntemann Remix) – 8:35

12": underworldlive.com, UWR-000019-4A (UK)
 "Crocodile" (Pete Heller Remix) – 7:33
 "Crocodile" (Innervisions Orchestra Remix) – 10:27

Charts

References

External links
Underworldlive.com
Underworldlive.com - "Crocodile" video

Underworld (band) songs
2007 singles
2007 songs
Songs written by Rick Smith (musician)
Songs written by Karl Hyde